Petra Cetkovská (born 8 February 1985) is a retired Czech tennis player. Having turned professional in 2000, she reached a career-high singles ranking of world No. 25, on 18 June 2012. Over her career, Cetkovská defeated top-ten players Marion Bartoli, Elena Dementieva, Angelique Kerber, Li Na, Agnieszka Radwańska, Caroline Wozniacki, and Vera Zvonareva.

Personal life
Cetkovská has been playing tennis since she was five. Her father Petr works at a pro shop in a local tennis club, while her mother Alena is a nurse. She has one younger brother, Matěj. Petra's father is of Macedonian origin.

When she was 14, Cetkovská was involved in an incident with a friend while playing sport when her friend had accidentally pushed her against a wall. Two years later, she had brain surgery due to the swelling caused by the incident. A year later, she had contracted glandular fever, further hampering her tennis career prospects and the third obstacle had come when she broke her foot playing the junior doubles final at the Australian Open.

Cetkovská speaks fluent French and English. She was involved in a relationship with ATP player Marcos Baghdatis when she was 19.

Career

2000–2006: mainly on ITF tournaments
In 2000, Cetkovská played the first events on the ITF Circuit, winning one doubles title. The following year, she won two singles titles and one doubles title. 
In 2002, when she competed in her first WTA Tour qualifying at Palermo, Cetkovská won two singles and two doubles titles on the ITF Circuit.

She won another singles title in 2003, and three ITF doubles titles in 2004. The following year, Cetkovská fell in WTA qualifying twice; but she won six singles titles and three doubles titles on the ITF Circuit. In 2006, she lost in Grand Slam qualifyings three times, at Roland Garros, Wimbledon and the US Open; however, she won one singles title and three doubles titles on ITF events.

2007
In 2007, she made a breakthrough in her WTA ranking. She won three ITF titles, and her first WTA doubles title with compatriot Andrea Hlaváčková at the Prague Open defeating Chinese pair Ji Chunmei/Sun Shengnan in the final.

As the 22nd seed in qualifying at the US Open, Cetkovská qualified for the main draw defeating Abigail Spears, Lucie Hradecká, and Anne Keothavong. She made her Grand-Slam debut beating American Jill Craybas in the first round but ended up losing in the second round to 14th seed Elena Dementieva.

Cetkovská ended the season ranked 99.

2008
Cetkovská began her season by playing qualifying at the Hobart International where she lost in the second round to third seed Ashley Harkleroad. At the Australian Open, she was defeated in the first round by world No. 34, Anabel Medina Garrigues.

At the French Open, Cetkovská reached the fourth round, only to be beaten by eventual champion Ana Ivanovic without winning a game.

2014

Cetkovská began the season during the last week of January at the Open GdF Suez. She lost in the final round of qualifying to Anna-Lena Friedsam. The week of 10 February saw Cetkovská compete at the Qatar Open. As the 13th seed for qualifying, she advanced to the main draw defeating wildcard Michaela Hončová and Anastasia Rodionova. She had a good run reaching the quarterfinals beating 14th seed Sloane Stephens, Zhang Shuai, and top seed and world No. 3, Li Na. Cetkovská ended up losing in the quarterfinals to sixth seed and eventual finalist Angelique Kerber. She was only able to win one game during the match.

In March, Cetkovská traveled to Indian Wells, California to compete at the Indian Wells Masters. She was defeated in the first round by American wildcard Shelby Rogers. Next week, Cetkovská played at the Miami Masters where she lost in the final round of qualifying to 20th seed Estrella Cabeza Candela. After Miami, Cetkovská stayed in Florida and competed at the Oaks Club Challenger. As the seventh seed, she beat American Melanie Oudin in the first round. Her campaign at the tournament ended as she withdrew from her second-round match versus Kiki Bertens.

Cetkovská started off her clay-court season in Charleston at the Family Circle Cup. She won her first round match over American Varvara Lepchenko. She then lost in the second round to 13th seed Elena Vesnina. During the week of 21 April, Cetkovská competed at the Morocco Open in Marrakesh. She was defeated in the first round by third seed Yvonne Meusburger. Cetkovská qualified for the Madrid Open beating Monica Puig and Mona Barthel. In the main draw, she won her first-round match dispatching Stefanie Vögele. She suffered a three-set loss in the second round to 16th seed Sloane Stephens.

2015

Cetkovská withdrew from the Australian Open due to a hip injury. Cetkovská returned from injury in March at the Indian Wells Open. She lost in the first round to American Christina McHale. At the Miami Open, Cetkovská was defeated in the first round by wildcard Paula Badosa Gibert.

She suffered a first-round loss at the French Open to Misaki Doi.

Cetkovská began her grass-court season seeded third at the Surbiton Trophy. After a first-round win over British wildcard Laura Deigman, she faced another British player, Naomi Broady. Cetkovská ended up losing in the second round to Broady. She had another first-round loss, this time at the Birmingham Classic, to qualifier Marina Erakovic. Cetkovská qualified for Wimbledon defeating Renata Voráčová, 15th seed Donna Vekić, and Elise Mertens. In the main draw, she lost in the first round to Tímea Babos.

Two weeks later, Cetkovská competed at the ITS Cup in her home country where she was the third seed and the defending champion. She advanced to the final with wins over Rebecca Šramková, Irina Ramialison, sixth seed Akgul Amanmuradova, and Ekaterina Alexandrova. Cetkovská ended up losing in the final to top seed and compatriot Barbora Krejčíková. During the week of 27 July, Cetkovská traveled to Poland to play at the Powiat Poznański Open. She would go on to win the title defeating Sofia Shapatava, seventh seed Romina Oprandi, third seed Richèl Hogenkamp, qualifier and compatriot Martina Borecká, and fourth seed Jeļena Ostapenko. The week of 10 August saw Cetkovská playing a minor league tournament in Prague, the Prague Open, which was a brand new tournament. Playing as a wildcard, she lost in the semifinals to seventh seed María Teresa Torró Flor.

Cetkovská had a great run at the US Open. She started off the tournament by beating Christina McHale in the first round in three sets. In the second round, Cetkovská had a huge win, upsetting fourth seed and last year finalist, Caroline Wozniacki. She saved four match points to complete the upset. In the third round, she lost to 26th seed and eventual champion Flavia Pennetta. Nevertheless, this was her best performance at the US Open.

After the US Open, Cetkovská played at the Open de Saint-Malo. After winning her first-round match, she retired during her match against Laura Pous Tió. This ended up being her last tournament of the year.

Cetkovská ended the season ranked 131.

2016
Cetkovská was supposed to start her season at the Hobart International, but she withdrew before the tournament started due to a lower back injury. She returned to action by competing at the Australian Open. This had been the first time since 2012 that Cetkovská played this tournament. She lost in the first round to thirtieth seed Sabine Lisicki.

In March, Cetkovská played at the Indian Wells Open. She was crushed in the first round by Denisa Allertová. The week after Indian Wells, she flew to Miami to play at the Miami Open. Cetkovská was again crushed in the first round, this time by British wildcard Heather Watson.

Cetkovská was going to begin her clay-court season at the Charleston Open, but she withdrew from the tournament due to a right thigh injury. She returned in May to play at the French Open. Due to having a low ranking (136), she played qualifying in order to make it into the main draw. She retired in the first round of qualifying to Kristína Kučová.

During the week of 11 July, Cetkovská competed at the ITS Cup. Despite being the second seed and last year finalist, she lost in the second round to compatriot Gabriela Pantůčková. Two weeks later, Cetkovská played another tournament in her country, the Prague Open. There, she was defeated in the first round by Rebecca Peterson.

Cetkovská did not play anymore tournaments for the rest of the season. She ended the year ranked 581.

Grand Slam performance timelines

Singles

Doubles

WTA career finals

Singles: 1 (runner-up)

Doubles: 5 (2 titles, 3 runner-ups)

ITF Circuit finals

Singles: 36 (23 titles, 13 runner-ups)

Doubles: 40 (25 titles, 15 runner-ups)

Head-to-head records

Record against top-10 players
 Marion Bartoli 2–0
 Elena Dementieva 1–1
 Sara Errani 2–1
 Ana Ivanovic 2–1
 Angelique Kerber 2–3
 Li Na 2–1
 Agnieszka Radwańska 4–0
 Sloane Stephens 1–3
 Caroline Wozniacki 2–2
 Vera Zvonareva 1–0

Top-10 wins

Notes

References

External links

 
 
 

Czech female tennis players
Sportspeople from Prostějov
1985 births
Living people
Czech people of Macedonian descent
Tennis players at the 2012 Summer Olympics
Australian Open (tennis) junior champions
Olympic tennis players of the Czech Republic
French Open junior champions
Grand Slam (tennis) champions in girls' doubles